The sixty-fourth Connecticut House of Representatives district elects one member of the Connecticut House of Representatives. Its current representative is Democrat Maria Horn. The district consists of the entire towns of Canaan, Cornwall, Kent, Norfolk, North Canaan, Sharon, and Salisbury, the southern part of Goshen, and much of the city of Torrington.

List of representatives

Recent elections

External links 
 Google Maps - Connecticut House Districts

References

64